Lists of foods named after places have been compiled by writers, sometimes on travel websites or food-oriented websites, as well as in books.

Since all of these names are words derived from place names, they are all toponyms. This article covers English language food toponyms which may have originated in English or other languages.

According to Delish.com, "[T]here's a rich history of naming foods after cities, towns, countries, and even the moon."

The following foods and drinks were named after places. Each non-obvious etymology is supported by a reference on the linked Wikipedia page. Food names are listed by country of the origin of the word, not necessarily where the food originated or was thought to have originated. Some foods are certified to originate in that region with a protected designation of origin (PDO).

Africa

 African eggplant
 African pepper
 Bourbon vanilla — Île Bourbon, now the island of Réunion
 Canarian wrinkly potatoes — Canary Islands
 Egyptian onion — Egypt
 Gabon nut — Gabon
 Guinea grains or Guinea peppers — the Guinea region of the African West coast
 Guineafowl — the Guinea region
 Galinha à africana — "African-style chicken"
 Madagascar vanilla — Madagascar
 Moroccan citron — Morocco
 Muscat of Alexandria — the city of Alexandria, Egypt
 Niger seed — the Niger River
 Sauce Africaine — "African sauce"
 Tunisian tajine — Tunisia
 Tangerine (and therefore Tangelo and Tangor) — the city of Tangier, Morocco
 Tunis cake — British cake named after the city of Tunis, Tunisia

Ethiopia
 Abyssinian tea (khat) — Abyssinia, the former name of Ethiopia
 Ethiopian banana
 Ethiopian cardamom
 Ethiopian eggplant
 Ethiopian mustard
 Ethiopian pepper

Asia
 Asian pear

East Asia
 Mongolian barbecue— Mongolia, though originating from the Taiwanese cuisine
 Mongolian beef — named after Mongolian barbecue
 Taiwanese fried chicken — Taiwan
 Taiwan tangerine

China

 Chinese steamed eggs
 Cantonese seafood soup — Canton province, now spelled Guangdong
 Sichuan pepper — Sichuan province
Fruits and vegetables
 Amur grape — the Amur River
 Chinese artichoke
 Chinese gooseberry (the original name of kiwifruit)
 Chinese mustard
 Chinese parsley — better known as coriander or cilantro
 Chinese pear and Chinese white pear
 Gobi manchurian — Indian fried cauliflower dish named after the Manchuria region
 Hainan yellow lantern chili — the island province of Hainan

Meat products and dishes

 Anfu ham — Anfu County, Jiangxi
 Chinese chicken salad
 Dezhou braised chicken — the city of Dezhou, Shandong
 Dong'an chicken — Dong'an County, Hunan
 Fujian red wine chicken — Fujian province
 Hainanese chicken rice — Hainan province
 Jinhua ham — the city of Jinhua, Zhejiang
 Lanzhou beef lamian — the city of Lanzhou, Gansu
 Nanjing Salted Duck — the city of Nanjing, Jiangsu
 Peking duck — the city of Beijing
 Peking pork — mistakenly after the city of Beijing
 Wenchang chicken — the city of Wenchang, Hainan
 Wuhan duck — the city of Wuhan, Hubei
 Wuxi Fried Spare Ribs — the city of Wuxi, Jiangsu
Staple food

 Chinese dumplings
 Chinese pancake 
 Chinese sticky rice
 Chinkiang pot cover noodles — the city of Zhenjiang, Jiangsu
 Danyang barley porridge — the city of Danyang, Jiangsu
 Hainanese curry rice — Hainan province
 Hokkien fried rice and Hokkien mee — Fujian province, formerly romanized as Hokkien 
 Shanghai fried noodles and Shanghai-style noodles — the city of Shanghai
 Yangzhou fried rice — the city of Yangzhou, Jiangsu

Japan

 Chikuzenni — chicken dish named after the historical Chikuzen Province, Kyushu
 Japanese curry
 Japanese rice
 Kobe beef — the city of Kobe, Kansai region
 Matsusaka beef — the city of Matsusaka, Mie, Kansai region
 Okinawa soba — noodle soup from the Okinawa Islands
 Yonezawa beef — the city of Yonezawa, Yamagata, Tōhoku region
Fruits

 Fuji apple — the town of Fujisaki, Aomori, northern Honshu
 Hyuganatsu — citrus named after the historical province of Hyūga
 Iyokan — citrus named after the historical province of Iyo
 Kiyomi — citrus named after the Kiyomi-gata lagoon in Shizuoka City
 Koshu grape — the city of Kōshū, Yamanashi
 Mutsu apple — Mutsu Province, northern Honshu
 Satsuma mandarin — the historical province of Satsuma
 Yubari King — melon named after the city of Yūbari, Hokkaido

Korea

 Korean barbecue
 Korean black goat stew
 Korean fried chicken
 Korean melon
 Korean tacos — Korean-Mexican fusion dish originated in Los Angeles
 Andong jjimdak — chicken dish named after the city of Andong, South Korea
 Cheongyang chili pepper — Cheongyang County, South Korea
 Chuncheon dakgalbi — stir-fried chicken from the city of Chuncheon, South Korea
 Chuncheon makguksu — buckwheat noodles dish from Chuncheon
 Gyeongju bread — the city of Gyeongju, South Korea
 Hamhung naengmyeon — noodles dish from the city of Hamhung, North Korea
 Hansik ganjang — "Korean-style soy sauce"
 Hwangnam bread —  from the province of Hwangnam-dong, South Korea
 Jeonju bibimbap — rice dish from the city of Jeonju, South Korea
 Pyongyang naengmyeon — noodle dish from the city of Pyongyang, North Korea

South Asia

 Afghan biscuits — New Zealand cookie named after Afghanistan
 Afghan salad — Afghanistan
 Bhutanese red rice — Bhutan
 Ceylon (curry) — Sri Lanka
 Ceylon cinnamon — Sri Lanka
 Chicken Lahori — the city of Lahore, Punjab, Pakistan
 Nepal cardamom — Nepal
 Rangpur — citrus fruit named after Rangpur City, Bangladesh
 Sindhi biryani — mixed rice dish named after Sindh province, Pakistan
 Sindhi pulao — rice pilaf named after Sindh province

India

 Allahabadi cake — the city of Allahabad, Uttar Pradesh, north India
 Bandel cheese — the city of Bandel, West Bengal
 Bombay duck — fish dish named after the city of Bombay
 Chicken Chettinad — the region of Chettinad, Tamil Nadu
Hyderabadi Biryani — the city Hyderabad and erstwhile Hyderabad State
Hyderabadi Haleem — the city Hyderabad and erstwhile Hyderabad State
Hyderabadi Marag — the city Hyderabad and erstwhile Hyderabad State
 Indian omelette
 Kalimpong cheese — the hill station of Kalimpong, West Bengal
 Madras curry sauce — the city of Madras (now Chennai), Tamil Nadu
 Malabar matthi curry — the Malabar Coast, southeast India
 Mangalore Buns - banana and yogurt fried bread from Mangalore 
 Mangalorean Bangude Masala — fish dish named after the city of Mangalore, Karnataka
 Mangalorean Chicken Sukka — the city of Mangalore, Karnataka
 Narsobawadi Basundi — dessert from the town of Narsobawadi, Maharashtra
Tirunelveli Halva — the city of Tirunelveli, Tamil Nadu
 Thoothukudi or Tuticorin macaroon — the city of Thoothukudi (formerly Tuticorin), Tamil Nadu
Fruits and vegetables

 Bangalore Blue — grape grown in districts around Bangalore city, Karnataka
 Bikaneri bhujia — bean-based snack food from the town of Bikaner, Rajasthan
 Devanahalli pomelo — the town of Devanahalli, Karnataka
 Mahabaleshwar strawberry — the city of Mahabaleshwar, Maharashtra
 Malabar spinach — the Malabar Coast
 Naga Morich, Dorset Naga and Naga Viper peppers — Nagaland state
 Nagpur orange — the city of Nagpur, Maharashtra
 Nashik grape — Nashik district, Maharashtra
 Tamarind — "date of India" in Arabic
 Tasgaon grapes — the city of Tasgaon, Maharashtra
 Udupi Mattu Gulla — eggplant from the village of Matti, Udupi, Karnataka
Staple food

 Bengal potatoes — the Bengal region
 Bhalia wheat — the Bhal region of Gujarat
 Bombay potatoes and Bombay toast — the city of Mumbai
 Hyderabadi biryani — rice dish from the city of Hyderabad, Telangana
 Indori Poha — rice dish from the city of Indore, Madhya Pradesh
 Kerala porotta — flatbread from Kerala state
 Palakkadan Matta rice — the district of Palakkad, Kerala
 Patna rice — the city of Patna, Bihar
 Thalassery biryani — rice dish from the town of Thalassery, Kerala

Southeast Asia

 Burmese tofu — Burma
 Crab Rangoon — the city of Rangoon, formally Yangon, Burma
 Katong Laksa — noodle soup named after the Katong precinct, Singapore
 Lao eggplant — Laos
 Lao sausage — Laos
 Maldive fish — the island country of Maldives
 Singapore chow mein — Cantonese fried noodle dish named after the city-state of Singapore
 Singapore-style noodles — Singapore

Indonesia
 
 
 Ayam taliwang — chicken dish named after the town of Karang Taliwang, near Mataram, Lombok
 Bakpia Pathok — sweet rolls from the Pathok suburb of Yogyakarta, Java
 Batavia cassia (or Indonesian cinnamon) — the city of Batavia, Dutch East Indies, now Jakarta
 Bika Ambon — cake first sold at Ambon Street, Medan, north Sumatra. The street may have been named after Ambon Island, Moluccas
 Garut orange — Garut Regency, West Java
 Mie aceh — noodle dish from the region of Aceh, Sumatra
 Nasi Kapau — rice dish from the town of Nagari Kapau, near Bukittinggi, West Sumatra
 Nasi Padang — rice banquet from the city of Padang, West Sumatra
 Padang cassia (Indonesian cinnamon) — the city of Padang, West Sumatra
 Padang crab — the city of Padang, West Sumatra
 Sambal cibiuk — hot sauce from Cibiuk district, Garut Regency, West Java
 Sate Bandeng — Banten province, Java
 Sate Padang — the city of Padang, West Sumatra

Malaysia
 Malay rose apple or pommerac (<"pomme Malac")
 Mee bandung Muar — the town of Muar, Johor
 Sarawak layer cake or 'Kek Lapis Sarawak — the state of Sarawak, northern Borneo
 Yong Peng bread — Chinese bread named after the town of Yong Peng

Philippines
 Bicol Express — the Bicol Region, Philippines
 Pancit Malabon — the city of Malabon, Metro Manila
 Pastel de Camiguín — the island province of Camiguin
 Sagada orange — the town of Sagada, Luzon

Thailand

 Mee siam — Malaysian noodle dish named after Siam (Thailand)
 Nasi goreng pattaya — Malaysian dish named after the Thai city of Pattaya, Chonburi
 Pad Thai — "fried Thai style"
 Sriracha sauce — the city of Si Racha, Chonburi Province
 Thai basil
 Thai crepes
 Thai eggplant
 Thai fried rice
 Thai ginger

Vietnam

 Bánh cuốn Thanh Trì — rice noodle roll from the Thanh Trì District of Hanoi
 Bún bò Huế — soup from the city of Huế
 Champa rice — the historical region of Champa
 Mì Quảng — Quảng Nam
 Saigon cinnamon — the city of Saigon, now Ho Chi Minh City
 Trảng Bàng dew-wetted rice paper — the Trảng Bàng District
 Vietnamese coriander
 Vietnamese eggplant

West Asia

 Azerbaijani pakhlava — a pastry from Azerbaijan
 Aleppo pepper — the city of Aleppo, Syria
 Nabulsi cheese — the city of Nablus, West Bank
 Damson or damson plum — the city of Damascus, Syria
 Phoenicia dessert — the ancient region of Phoenicia headquartered in present day Lebanon

Armenia

 Armenian apple— the most common apricot, named "Prunus armeniaca"
 Armenian cracker bread or "Armenian lavash" 
 Armenian cucumber
 Armenian pizza
 Armenian plum — "Prunus armeniaca"
 Armenian string cheese

Iran

 Iranian pizza
 Khorasan wheat — the historical region of Khorasan
 Lighvan cheese — the village of Liqvan
 Peach — via Latin Persica — Persia
 Persian and Persian bun — Canadian and American sweet breads named after Iran
 Persian cumin
 Persian lime
 Persian melon
 Təbriz meatballs — the city of Tabriz, Iranian Azerbaijan

Israel

 Ackawi — city of Acre, Northern District
 Israeli eggplant salad
 Israeli salad
 Jaffa orange — the city of Jaffa (Jaffa Cakes and Jaffas are named after the Jaffa orange)
 Jerusalem artichoke, — probably NOT named after the city of Jerusalem, but after the Italian word for sunflower (girasole)
 Jerusalem mixed grill — the city of Jerusalem
 Palestinian sweet lime — the historical Palestine region
 Scallion and Shallot — onion names both derived from the city of Ashkelon
 Tzfat cheese — the city of Safed, Northern District

Turkey

 Turkey fowl (despite not being from Turkey—see Turkey (bird)#Names)
 Gemlik olive — the town of Gemlik, Bursa Province
 Harput meatballs — the historic city of Harput, now Elazığ, Eastern Anatolia
 İnegöl meatballs — the city of İnegöl, Marmara Region
 Smyrna meatballs — the ancient city of Smyrna, Aegean Region
 Tire meatballs — the district of Tire, İzmir, Aegean Region
 Turkish delight 
 Van köfte — meatballs from the city of Van, Eastern Anatolia

Europe

Balkan States
 Albanian vegetable pie — Albania
 Bosnian Pot — Bosnia
 Bulgarian yogurt — Bulgaria
 Cherni Vit (cheese) — the village of Cherni Vit, Bulgaria
 Elenski but — ham from the town of Elena, Veliko Tarnovo, Bulgaria
 Macedonia — mixed salad alluding to the diverse origin of the people of Alexander's Macedonian Empire
 Shopska salad — the Shopluk region in Bulgaria, Serbia, and Macedonia
 Sremska sausage — the district of Srem, Vojvodina, Serbia

Croatia
 Istrian stew — the Istria peninsula
 Međimurska gibanica — cake from Međimurje County
 Morlacco — Italian cheese named after the historical Morlachia region now located in Croatia
 Pag cheese — the island of Pag
 Rab cake — the island of Rab

Romania
 Magiun of Topoloveni — a plum named after the town of Topoloveni, Argeș County
 Nădlac sausage — the town of Nădlac, Arad County
 Penteleu cheese — the Penteleu Massive, Buzău County
 Pleșcoi sausages — the village of Pleşcoi, Buzău County
 Sibiu sausages — the city of Sibiu, Transylvania

Central Europe

Austria

 Donauwelle — the Danube river
 Linzer biscuit — the city of Linz, Upper Austria
 Hot Wiener — the city of Vienna
 Linzer torte — Linz
 Salzburger Nockerl — the city of Salzburg
 Tyrolean Speck — the County of Tyrol
 Vienna bread — the city of Vienna
 Vienna Fingers and Viennese Whirls — American and British cookies named after Vienna
 Vienna sausage or Wiener — Vienna
 Viennoiserie — Viennese-style baked goods
 Wiener Schnitzel — Vienna
 Wienerbrød — Vienna

Czech Republic

 Pozsonyi kifli — Hungarian pastry named after the Slovak city of Bratislava ("Pozsonyi" in Hungarian)
 Liptauer — cheese spread named after the historical region of Liptov, Slovakia
 Olomoucké tvarůžky or Olmützer cheese — the city of Olomouc, Moravia, Czech Republic
 Moravian spice cookies — the historical country Moravia
 Prague Ham — the city of Prague
 Prasky — sausage named after Prague
 Šumavská topinka — Scrambled eggs on fried bread, named by Šumava forest region (National park)

Germany

 Allemande sauce — Germany (Allemande in French)
 Bamberg potato — the city of Bamberg, Bavaria
 Bavarois or Bavarian cream — the state of Bavaria
 Frankfurter Grüne Soße — sauce from the city of Frankfurt
 German fries
 German potato pancakes
 Hamburger Aalsuppe — a fish soup from the city of Hamburg
 Hamburg parsley — the city of Hamburg
 Harzer — cheese from the Harz mountain range
 Waldorf salad — via the Waldorf Hotel after the town of Walldorf, Baden, where the Astoria family originated from
Baked goods

 Aachener Printen — gingerbread from the city of Aachen, North Rhine-Westphalia
 Battenberg cake — the town of Battenberg ("Mountbatten"), Hesse
 Berliner — pastry from the city of Berlin
 Black Forest cake or Black Forest gateau — not directly named after the Black Forest mountain range in southwestern Germany, but from the speciality liquor of that region, known as Schwarzwälder Kirsch(wasser) and distilled from tart cherries
 Bremer Klaben — fruit cake from the city of Bremen
 Dutch baby — American pancake perhaps named after the Netherlands, but probably via "deutsch" referring to Germany
 Frankfurter Kranz — cake from the city of Frankfurt, Hesse
 German biscuit
 German toast — Germany
 Leipziger Lerche — pastry from the city of Leipzig, Saxony
Meat products and dishes

 Ammerländer Schinken — ham from the district of Ammerland, Lower Saxony
 Black Forest ham — the Black Forest mountain range, southwest Germany
 Nürnberger Bratwurst — the city of Nuremberg, Bavaria
 Braunschweiger — sausage from the city of Braunschweig, Lower Saxony
 Brunswick stew — perhaps after Braunschweig (Brunswick)
 Frankfurter, Frankfurter Rindswurst, Frankfurter Würstchen, and Frankfurter Würstel — sausages named for the city of Frankfurt
 Frankfurter Rippchen — pork dish from Frankfurt
 Gaisburger Marsch — beef stew named after the  district of Stuttgart
 Hamburg steak and Hamburger — the city of Hamburg
 Königsberger Klopse — meatball dish from the city of Königsberg, now Kaliningrad, a Russian exclave
 Pichelsteiner — stew named after the Büchelstein, a hill in the Bavarian Forest
 Regensburger Wurst — the city of Regensburg, Bavaria
 Thüringer rotwurst — the state of Thuringia
 Westfälische Rinderwurst — the region of Westphalia
 Westphalian ham — the region of Westphalia

Hungary

 Debrecener — sausage named after the city of Debrecen
 Hortobágyi palacsinta — pancake named after the Hortobágy National Park
 Csabai — sausage from the city of Békéscsaba, Békés County
 Gyulai — sausage from the town of Gyula, Békés County
 Hungarian wax pepper
 Hungarian goulash

Poland

 Bialy — bread roll named after the city of Białystok, Podlaskie
 Korycinski cheese — the town of Korycin, Podlaskie
 '"Krakauer"' or Krakowska — sausage named after the city of Kraków, Lesser Poland
 Obwarzanek krakowski — another bread named after Kraków
 Paprykarz szczeciński— fish spread named after the city of Szczecin, West Pomerania
 Pasztecik szczeciński — deep fried pie from Szczecin
 Polish Boy — American sausage sandwich
 Polish sausage
 Silesian dumplings — the Silesia region of Central Europe
 Toruń gingerbread or Thorner Lebkuchen — the city of Toruń, Pomerania

Slovenia
 Belokranjska povitica — cake from the Bela Krajina (White Carniola) region
 Carniolan sausage — the historical region of Carniola
 Idrijski žlikrofi — dumplings from the town of Idrija
 Prekmurska gibanica or Prekmurje layer pastry — pastry from the Prekmurje region

Switzerland

 Bündnerfleisch — dried meat from the canton of Graubünden
 Swiss chard
 Swiss steak
 Zürcher Geschnetzeltes — meat dish from the city of Zürich
Baked goods

 Basler Brot and Basler Läckerli — bread and cookies from the city of Basel
 Berner Haselnusslebkuchen and Berner Honiglebkuchen — cakes from the city of Bern
 Bündner Nusstorte or Engadiner Nusstorte — sweet pastry from (the Engadin region of) the Graubünden canton
 Couque suisse — Belgian sweet roll
 Pain de seigle valaisan — bread from the canton of Valais
 Pane ticinese — bread from the canton of Ticino, Switzerland
 Papet vaudois — mashed potatoes and leek from the canton of Vaud
 Swiss roll 
 Zuger Kirschtorte — layer cake from the city or canton of Zug, Switzerland
 Zürcher Murren — bread roll from the city of Zürich
Cheeses

 Appenzeller — the canton of Appenzell
 Berner Alpkäse and Berner Hobelkäse — the Bernese Oberland region
 Emmentaler — Emmental, the name of a valley in the canton of Bern 
 Gruyère — the town of Gruyères in the canton of Fribourg
 L'Etivaz — the hamlet of L'Etivaz in the canton of Vaud
 Swiss cheese — American cheese named for its resemblance to Emmental cheese
 Tomme Vaudoise — the canton of Vaud
 Vacherin Fribourgeois — the canton of Fribourg

Eastern Europe

Baltic states
 Liveland Raspberry apple — the Governorate of Livonia ("Livland" in German), now part of Latvia and Estonia
 Tartu Rose — apple named after the city of Tartu, Estonia

Russia

 Amur grape — the Amur River
 Borodinsky bread — the village of Borodino, Moscow Oblast
 Circassian cheese — the historical region of Circassia in the North Caucasus
 Circassian chicken — Circassia
 Red Astrachan apple — the city or oblast of Astrachan
 Ruske kape — Balkan cakes named "Russian hats"
 Russian candy or Russian chocolate
 Russian dressing
 Russian food — named  after Russia
 Russian salad
 Russian tea cake
 Siberian tomato — American tomato named after Siberia for its cold resistance
 Tilsit cheese — the town of Tilsit in East Prussia (now Sovetsk)
 Tula pryanik — the city of Tula, western Russia
 Vologda butter — the Vologda region

Ukraine
 Black Krim — a tomato from the Crimea peninsula
 Chicken Kiev — the city of Kyiv
 Griotte de Kleparow— a cherry from the historical area of Klepariv, now a suburb of the city of Lviv

Nordic countries

 Faroese puffin — poultry from the Faroe Islands
 Karelian hot pot or Karelian stew — from Karelia, a region in Russia and Finland
 Karelian pasties — Karelia
 Lappi cheese — the Lapland region of Finland
 Turun sinappi or Åbo senap — brand of mustard named after the city of Turku / Åbo, Finland

Denmark

 Danbo cheese — Denmark
 Danish Bacon (a brand)
 Danish biscuits
 Danish pastry or just Danish
 Fynbo — cheese from the island of Fyn
 Gravenstein apple — the town of Gråsten ("Gravenstein" in German), Northern Schleswig
 Maribo cheese — the town of Maribo, Lolland
 Molbo cheese — the Mols peninsula of Jutland
 Samsø cheese — the island of Samsø
 Sol over Gudhjem — open sandwich from the town of Gudhjem, Bornholm

Norway

 Bergen fish soup — the city of Bergen, Hordaland
 Bergenost — American cheese brand named after the city of Bergen
 Gudbrandsdalsost — cheese from the Gudbrand Valley, Oppland
 Jarlsberg cheese — the former county of Jarlsberg, now part of Vestfold
 Norvegia cheese — Norway

Sweden

 Åkerö apple — the Åkerö Manor, Södermanland
 Falukorv — sausage named after the city of Falun, Dalarna County
 Gotland Blue cheese — the island province of Gotland
 Kalmar Glasäpple — the city of Kalmar, Kalmar County
 Scanian eggcake — the southern province of Scania
 Svecia cheese — Sweden
 Swede
 Swedish fruit soup 
 Swedish meatballs
 Swedish pancakes
 Västerbotten cheese — the northern province of Västerbotten (West Botnia)

Southern Europe
 Gibraltar rock — American candy named after the Rock of Gibraltar on the southern Iberian Peninsula
 Jamón ibérico — "Iberian ham"
 Monte Carlo — British cookie named after the city of Monte Carlo, Monaco
 Torta Tre Monti — the three peaks of Monte Titano, San Marino

Greece
 Arroz à grega — Brazilian rice dish named after Greece
 Fenugreek — herb named "hay of Greece"
 Graviera — cheese from the region of Agrafa on Crete
 Greek pizza 
 Greek Yoghurt — a yoghurt that has been strained to remove its whey, also "Greek-style Yoghurt"
 Metsovone — cheese from the region of Metsovo in Epirus
 Psarosoupa patmou — fish soup from the island of Patmos
Fruits and vegetables

 Currant (e.g. Blackcurrant, Redcurrant, Whitecurrant) — the city of Corinth, Peloponnese
 Golden Greek pepper
 Greek citron
 Kalamata olive — the city of Kalamata, Peloponnese
 Quince — the ancient city-state of Kydonia, Crete
 Santorini tomato — the island of Santorini
 Spartan apple — the ancient city-state of Sparta
 Zante currant — the Ionian island of Zante and the city of Corinth, Peloponnese

Italy

 Arborio rice — the town of Arborio, Piedmont
 Baccalà alla lucana — fish dish from Basilicata, in the past known as Lucania
 Baccalà alla vicentina — fish dish from the city of Vicenza, Veneto
 Eggs Florentine — the city of Florence, Tuscany
 Italian ice
 Naporitan — Japanese dish named after the city of Naples
 Neapolitan ice cream — the city of Naples
 Prosecco - a sparkling white wine named after the town of Prosecco
 Sardines — the island of Sardinia

Baked goods

 Amaretti di Saronno — cookie from Saronno, Lombardy
 Buccellato di Lucca — cake from the city of Lucca, Tuscany
 Coppia ferrarese — bread from the Province of Ferrara
 Crocetta of Caltanissetta — sweets from the Province of Caltanissetta
 Florentine Biscuit — the city of Florence, Tuscany
 Genoa cake and Genoise or Genovese cake — the city of Genoa, Liguria
 Italian sandwich
 Italian tomato pie
 Neapolitan pizza and Neapolitan wafer — the city of Naples
 Nocciolini di Canzo — cookies from the town of Canzo, Lombardy
 Nocciolini di Chivasso — cookies from the town of Chivasso in the metropolitan area of Turin, Piedmont
 Pane di Altamura — bread from the city of Altamura, Apulia
 Pane toscano — bread from the Tuscany region
 Pizza pugliese — the Apulia region of southeast Italy
 Sicilian pizza — the island of Sicily
 Stromboli — pizza named via the film Stromboli — the island of Stromboli
 Torta alla Monferrina — the Montferrat region of Piedmont
 Torta caprese — the island of Capri, Campania
Cheeses

 Asiago — Asiago, plateau and town in the Venetian Prealps
 Bastardo del Grappa — Monte Grappa in the Venetian Prealps
 Bra — the town of Bra in Piedmont
 Casciotta d'Urbino — the city of Urbino in the Marche region
 Castelmagno — the municipality of Castelmagno in Piedmont
 Gorgonzola — the town of Gorgonzola near Milan
 Grana Padano — the Po Valley (Pianura Padana)
 Montasio — the mountain Jôf di Montasio in the Julian Alps
 Monte Veronese — the Province of Verona
 Pallone di Gravina — the town of Gravina in Puglia in Apulia
 Parmesan— the city or province of Parma, Emilia-Romagna
 Parmigiano-Reggiano — the cities of Parma and Reggio, Emilia-Romagna
 Pecorino di Filiano — the town of Filiano in the southern region of Basilicata
 Pecorino Romano — the city of Rome
 Pecorino Sardo — the island of Sardinia
 Pecorino Siciliano — the island of Sicily
 Pecorino Toscano — the region of Tuscany
 Piave — the Piave river in the Veneto region
 Quiche florentine — Florence
 Ragusano — the Province of Ragusa on Sicily
 Robiola — possibly named after the town of Robbio in Lombardy
 Romano cheese — American pecorino-style cheese named after Rome
 Rosa Camuna — the Val Camonica in Lombardy
 Taleggio — Val Taleggio in Lombardy
 Valle d'Aosta Fromadzo — the Aosta Valley region
 Valtellina Casera — the Valtellina valley in Lombardy

Fruits and vegetables
 Aprutino Pescarese — the Province of Pescara, Abruzzo
 Bosana — the town of Bosa, Sardinia
 Cantaloupe — the town of Cantalupo in Sabina, Lazio
 Caprese salad — the island of Capri, Campania
 Cerignola olive — the town of Cerignola, Apulia
 Florence fennel — the city of Florence, Tuscany
 Florentine citron — Florence
 Giarratana onion — the town of Giarratana, Sicilly
 Italia (grape)
 Italian sweet pepper
 Lucques olive — the city of Lucca, Tuscany
 Mazzarrone (grape) — the town of Mazzarrone, Sicilly
 Nocellara del Belice — the Valle del Belice, Sicily
 Castelvetrano olive — the town of Castelvetrano, Sicily
 Parmigiana — eggplant dish named after the city of Parma
 Pomodorino Vesuviano — tomato named after the Vesuvius volcano
 Pomodoro di Pachino — the town of Pachino, Sicily
 Roma tomato — the city of Rome
 San Marzano tomato — the town of San Marzano sul Sarno, Campania
 Sicilian orange salad — the island of Sicily
 Siracusa lemon — the province of Syracuse, Sicily
 Tuscan pepper — the region of Tuscany
Meat products and dishes

 Bologna sausage — the city of Bologna, Emilia-Romagna
 Chicken Marengo — via the Battle of Marengo — the town of Spinetta Marengo, Piedmont
 Chicken marsala — via Marsala wine — the city of Marsala, Sicily
 Chicken parmigiana — the city or province of Parma
 Chicken Vesuvio — the vulcano of Vesuvius
 Cotechino Modena — the city of Modena, Emilia-Romagna
 Florentine steak — the city of Florence, Tuscany
 Genoa salami — the city of Genoa, Liguria
 Italian beef
 Italian hot dog 
 Italian sausage
 Likëngë, Loukaniko and Lucanica — sausages named after the ancient area of Lucania in southern Italy
 Milanesa or Cotoletta alla Milanese — meat fillet dish named after the city of Milan
 Parma ham or "Prosciutto di Parma " and Parmo — the city of Parma, Emilia-Romagna
 Paupiettes de Volaille Florentine — a French roulade named after the city of Florence
 Saltimbocca alla Romana — the city of Rome
 Sopressa Vicentina — salami from the city of Vicenza, Veneto
 Spaghetti bolognese — the city of Bologna, Emilia-Romagna
 Speck Alto Adigo — bacon from the province of Alto Adige / South Tyrol

Sauces and dressings
 Amatriciana sauce — the town of Amatrice, Lazio
 Barese ragù — the city of Bari, Apulia
 Bolognese sauce — the city of Bologna, Emilia-Romagna
 Italian dressing
 Neapolitan sauce and Neapolitan ragù — the city of Naples, Campania
 Pesto alla Genovese — the city of Genoa, Liguria
 Venetian sauce — the city of Venice
 Aceto balsamico tradizionale di Modena
Soups
 Buridda alla Genovese — the city of Genoa, Liguria
 Soup alla Canavese — the Canavese region, Piedmont
 Soup alla modenese — the city of Modena, Emilia-Romagna
 Zuppa pavese — the city of Pavia, Lombardy
 Zuppa toscana — the province of Tuscany

Portugal

 Carne de porco à alentejana — pork meat from the Alentejo region
 Castelo Branco cheese — the city or district of Castelo Branco
 Galinha à portuguesa — Macao dish named "Portuguese-style chicken"
 Madeira cake — via Madeira wine after the Portuguese islands of Madeira
 Ovos Moles de Aveiro — sweet from the Aveiro District
 Portuguese asado — roasted fish dish
 Portuguese sauce
 Portuguese sweet bread
 Queijo de Nisa — cheese from the municipality of Nisa, Portalegre 
 Queijo do Pico — cheese from Pico Island, one of the Portuguese Azores islands
 Santarém cheese — the Santarém District 
 São Jorge cheese — São Jorge Island in the Azores
 Serra da Estrela cheese — the Serra da Estrela mountain range

Spain

 Albufera sauce — via the Duke of Albufera after the Albufera lagoon, eastern Spain
 Arroz a la valenciana — Latin American rice dish named after Valencia
 Castella — Japanese cake named after the historical region of Castile
 Chorizo de Pamplona — sausage from the city of Pamplona, Navarre
 Espagnole sauce — Spain
 Lacón Gallego — ham from the region of Galicia
 Mantecadas de Astorga — pastry from the town of Astorga, Léon
 Mató de Pedralbes — pastry from the Pedralbes neighborhood of Barcelona, Spain
 Mayonnaise — perhaps named after the city of Mahón, capital of the island of Menorca
 Morcilla de Burgos — sausage from the city of Burgos, Castile
 Sauce andalouse — Belgian sauce named after the Andalusia region of southern Spain
 Spanische Windtorte — Austrian cake named after Spain
 Spanish omelette
 Spanish rice — the American name for a Mexican side dish
 Valencian paella — the city, province or region of Valencia
 Valencia rice — Valencia
 Vic fuet — sausage from the town of Vic, Catalonia
Cheeses

 Alpujarra — Alpujarra region, Andalusia
 Cabrales — Cabrales, a municipality in Asturias
 Cantabrian Cream — the autonomous community of Cantabria
 Casín cheese — Caso, a municipality in Asturias
 Flor de Guía — Santa María de Guía, a town in the Canary Islands
 Gamonéu — the small town of Gamonéu in Onís, Asturias
 Garrotxa — Garrotxa county in Catalonia
 Ibores — the Ibor Valley in Extremadura
 Idiazabal — the small town of Idiazabal, Basque Country
 La Serena — the La Serena district in Extremadura
 Mahón — the city of Port Mahon on the Balearic Islands
 Mallorca — the island of Mallorca
 Manchego — La Mancha region
 Murcian and Murcian wine cheese — the autonomous community of Murcia
 Palmero — the island of La Palma
 Picón Bejes-Tresviso — the small town of Tresviso in Cantabria
 Roncal — the Roncal Valley in Navarre
 Torta del Casar — Casar de Cáceres, a municipality in Extremadura
 Valdeón — Posada de Valdeón, a municipality in Castile and León
 Zamorano — the Province of Zamora
Fruits, nuts and vegetables

 Alicante tomato — the city or province of Alicante
 Arbequina olive — the village of Arbeca, Catalonia
 Figueres onion — the town of Figueres, Catalonia
 Padrón peppers — the town of Padrón, Galicia
 Seville orange — the city of Seville, Andalusia
 Spanish lime
 Spanish peanut
 Spanish thyme
 Valencia orange — American cultivar named after the city or province of Valencia
Soups and stews
 Caldo gallego ("Galician broth") — the Galicia region
 Minorcan clam chowder — the Balearic Island of Menorca (historically called "Minorca")
 Cocido lebaniego — stew from the region of Liébana, Cantabria
 Cocido madrileño — stew from the city of Madrid
 Fabada asturiana — the province of Asturias
 Pisto manchego — eggplant stew from the La Mancha region
 Porra antequerana — the city of Antequera, Andalusia

Western Europe
 Éisleker Ham — the Oesling/Éislek region of Luxembourg

Belgium
 Belgian biscuit
 Belgian bun
 Belgian endive
 Belgian pralines
 Belgium sausage — Australian product named after Belgium
 Belgian waffle
 Beurre d'Ardenne — butter from the Ardennes region
 Brussels sprouts — the city of Brussels
 Café liégeois — French dessert named after the city of Liège
 Carbonade flamande or Flemish Stew — the County of Flanders
 Couque de Dinant — cookies from the city of Dinant, Namur
 Limburger cheese — the former Duchy of Limburg
 Passendale cheese — the village of Passendale, West Flanders
 Sirop de Liège — fruit spread from the city of Liège
 Waterloo cheese — English cheese named after the town of Waterloo, Brabant

France

 Belle de Fontenay — potato named after the suburb of Fontenay-sous-Bois, Paris
 Beurre d'Isigny — butter from the town of Isigny-sur-Mer, Normandy
 Bisque — soup named after the Bay of Biscay between Spain and France
 Camargue red rice — the Camargue region, Bouches-du-Rhône
 Crème Chantilly — another term for "whipped cream", after Chantilly, Oise, Hauts-de-France
 French fries is from Belgium.
 French toast
 French onion soup
 French vanilla
 Lyonnaise potatoes — the city of Lyon
 Vichyssoise soup — the city of Vichy, Auvergne
Baked goods

 Biscuit rose de Reims — the city of Reims, Marne, Grand Est
 Bourbon biscuit — British cookie named, via the House of Bourbon — the historic Bourbonnais region
 Breton galette and Crêpe bretonne — the region of Brittany
 Bugnes lyonnaise — the city of Lyon 
 Chantilly cake — indirectly after the castle at and village of Chantilly, Oise, Hauts-de-France
 Coussin de Lyon — sweet from the city of Lyon
 Dacquoise — cake named after the town of Dax, Landes
 Far Breton — cake from the region of Brittany
 Ficelle picarde — savory pancake from the region of Picardy
 Franzbrötchen — German pastry named after France
 French toast
 Gâteau Basque — pastry from Basque Country
 Jordan almonds — confectionary perhaps named after the town of Verdun, Meuse
 Nice biscuit or Nizza — a cookie named after the city of Nice, Alpes-Maritimes
 Norman Tart — the Normandy region
 Paris buns — Scottish breadlike cake named after Paris
 Paris–Brest — pastry named for the cities of Paris and Brest, Brittany
 Pithivier — pie named after the town of Pithiviers, Loiret, central France
 Quiche lorraine — the historical region of Lorraine
Cheeses

 Abondance — the commune of Abondance, Haute-Savoie
 Banon — the town of Banon in the Provence
 Beaufort — the commune of Beaufort, Savoie
 Bleu d'Auvergne — the central historical province of Auvergne
 Bleu de Gex — the eastern historical Pays de Gex
 Brie — the historical Brie region near Paris
 Camembert — the town of Camembert, Orne, Normandy
 Cantal — the central department of Cantal
 Chaource — the village of Chaource in the Champagne region
 Comté — the eastern Franche-Comté region
 Crottin de Chavignol — the village of Chavignol, France in the central Loire valley
 Époisses — the village of Époisses, Burgundy
 Fourme de Montbrison — Montbriso in the upper Loire valley.
 Laguiole — the village of Laguiole in the southern Aveyron department
 Langres — the Langres plateau in the Champagne region
 Livarot — the town of Livarot in Normandy
 Mâconnais — the city of Mâcon, Saône-et-Loire
 Maroilles — the village of Maroilles near the Belgian border
 Morbier — the village of Morbier near the Swiss border
 Munster — the town of Munster, Haut-Rhin in the Alsace region
 Neufchâtel — the town of Neufchâtel-en-Bray in upper Normandie
 Ossau-iraty — the Ossau Valley and the Irati Forest, French Basque Country
 Pont-l'Évêque — the town of Pont-l'Évêque, Calvados, Normandy
 Pouligny-Saint-Pierre — the commune of Pouligny-Saint-Pierre, Indre 
 Rigotte de Condrieu — the town of Condrieu, Rhône
 Rocamadour — the village of Rocamadour in Occitanie

 Roquefort — the village of Roquefort-sur-Soulzon in Occitanie
 Sainte-Maure de Touraine — the town of Sainte-Maure-de-Touraine in the Loire valley
 Selles-sur-Cher — the town of Selles-sur-Cher in the Loire valley
 Tomme de Savoie — the historic region of Savoy
 Valençay — the town of Valençay, Indre
Fruits and vegetables

 Anjou pear or Beurré d'Anjou — the historical region of Anjou
 Corsican citron — the island of Corsica
 Espelette pepper — the town of Espelette, French Basque Country
 Mirabelle de Lorraine plum — the region of Lorraine
 Montmorency cherry — the town of Montmorency, Val-d'Oise
 Muscat du Ventoux — grape from Mont Ventoux, Provence
 Niçoise (olive), Olive de Nice and Salade niçoise — the city of Nice
 Poire à la Beaujolaise — pear recipe named after the historical province of Beaujolais
 Salonenque olive — the town of Salon-de-Provence, Bouches-du-Rhône
 Nyons olive — the town of Nyons, Drôme
Meat products and dishes

 Bayonne ham — the city of Bayonne, French Basque Country
 Beef bourguignon — the Burgundy (Bourgogne) region
 Boudin blanc de Rethel — the town of Rethel, Champagne
 Cervelas de Lyon — the city of Lyon
 Chateaubriand steak — probably after the town of Châteaubriant, Loire-Atlantique
 Lyoner sausage — Lyon
 Morteau sausage — the town of Morteau, Franche-Comté
 Pariser Schnitzel — the city of Paris
 Rosette de Lyon and Saucisson de Lyon — Lyon
 Saucisse de Toulouse — the city of Toulouse, Occitanie

Sauces, dressings and condiments
Sauce Américaine — the ancient region of Armorica
Béarnaise sauce — the province of Béarn, Pyrénées-Atlantiques
 Bordelaise sauce — the city of Bordeaux, Gironde
 Breton sauce — the region of Brittany
 Café de Paris sauce — Paris
 Dijon mustard — the city of Dijon, Burgundy
 French dip and French onion dip
 French dressing
 Honey Dijon dressing — the city of Dijon
 Nantua sauce — the village of Nantua, Ain
 Normande sauce — the Normandy region 
 Rouennaise sauce — the city of Rouen, Normandy
 Sauce Américaine, originally Sauce armoricaine — Armorica, an ancient region of northwest France
 Sauce bourguignonne — the Burgundy (Bourgogne) region
 Sauce lyonnaise — the city of Lyon
 Sauce parisienne — Paris

Ireland

 Dublin Bay prawn — the city of Dublin
 Dubliner cheese — Dublin
 Irish breakfast
 Full Irish breakfast roll
 Irish Lumper and Irish White potatoes
 Irish soda bread
 Irish stew — Ireland
 Limerick ham — County Limerick
 Ulster Emblem — potato from the historic province of Ulster
 Ulster fry — breakfast from Ulster
 Waterford Blaa — a doughy, white bread bun (roll) speciality particularly associated with Waterford, Ireland

Netherlands
 Belle de Boskoop apple — the town of Boskoop, South Holland
 Boskoop Glory grape — the town of Boskoop
 Bossche bol — pastry from the city of Den Bosch, North Brabant
 Dutch apple pie
 Dutch biscuits
 Dutch carnival cake 
 Dutch crunch bread
 Dutch doughnut and Dutchie (doughnut) 
 Dutch letter — almond pastry
 Dutch licorice
 Dutch loaf — luncheon meat
 Dutch pancake
 Dutch process chocolate
 Dutch waffle
 Elstar apple — the city of Elst, Gelderland
 Hollandaise sauce — the Holland region
 Zeeuws spek — bacon dish from the province of Zeeland
 Zeeuwse bolus — pastry from Zeeland

Cheeses
 Beemster — the Beemster polder, North Holland
 Edam — the city of Edam, North Holland
 Friesian Clove — the province of Friesland
 Gouda — the city of Gouda, South Holland
 Leerdammer — the city of Leerdam, South Holland
 Leyden — the city of Leiden, South Holland
 Maasdam — the village of Maasdam, South Holland
 Old Amsterdam — brand of Gouda cheese named after the city of Amsterdam

United Kingdom

 Coleraine Cheddar — the town of Coleraine, Northern Ireland
 Guernsey Bean Jar — bean stew from the island of Guernsey
 Guernsey Gâche — raisin bread from Guernsey
 Jersey Royal potato — the island of Jersey
 Manks Codlin — apple from the Isle of Man
 Manx Queenie — scallop harvested around the Isle of Man
 Ulster Emblem — potato from the historic Irish province of Ulster
 Ulster fry — breakfast from Ulster

England

 Brown Windsor soup — perhaps via the Windsor bean after the town of Windsor, Berkshire
 Cornish clotted cream and Cornish ice cream — the county of Cornwall
 Cornish sardines — the county of Cornwall
 Dover sole — the town of Dover, Kent
 English breakfast 
 Eton mess — the town of Eton, Berkshire
 Everton mint — candy from the Everton suburb of Liverpool 
 Grimsby smoked fish — the town of Grimsby, Lincolnshire
 Kendal Mint Cake — peppermint candy from the town of Kendal, Cumbria
 Kentish well pudding — the county of Kent
 Malvern pudding — the town of Malvern, Worcestershire
 Pontefract cake — licorice candy from the town of Pontefract, Yorkshire
 Sussex pond pudding — Sussex county

Baked goods
 Bakewell pudding and Bakewell tart — the town of Bakewell, Derbyshire
 Banbury cake — the town of Banbury, Oxfordshire
 Bath bun and Bath Oliver cracker — the city of Bath, Somerset
 Bedfordshire clanger — the county of Bedfordshire
 Chelsea bun — the Chelsea area of London
 Chorley cake — the town of Chorley, Lancashire
 Cornish fairings and Cornish pasty — the county of Cornwall
 Cumberland pie — the historic county of Cumberland
 Dorset apple cake — Dorset county
 Dorset knob — flatbread from Dorset county
 Eccles cake — the town of Eccles, Greater Manchester
 English muffin
 Lincoln biscuit — the city of Lincoln, Lincolnshire
 London bun — the city of London
 Manchester tart — the city of Manchester
 Sandwich — via the 4th Earl of Sandwich after the village of Sandwich, Kent
 Shrewsbury cake or biscuit — the town of Shrewsbury, Shropshire
 Staffordshire oatcake — Staffordshire county
 Tottenham cake — the Tottenham area of northern London
 Yorkshire pudding — Yorkshire county

Cheeses
 Ashdown Foresters — the Ashdown Forest heathland, East Sussex
 Beacon Fell Traditional Lancashire Cheese — Beacon Fell, Lancashire
 Beenleigh Blue — Beenleigh Manor, Harberton, Devon
 Bowland cheese — the Forest of Bowland, Lancashire
 Brighton Blue — the city of Brighton, East Sussex
 Buxton Blue — the town of Buxton, Derbyshire
 Cheddar — the village of Cheddar, Somerset
 Cheshire — Cheshire county
 Coquetdale cheese — the valley of the River Coquet, Northumberland
 Cornish Blue, Cornish Brie and Cornish Yarg — the county of Cornwall
 Cotswold cheese — via Cotswold stone after the Cotswolds area
 Derby, Little Derby and Sage Derby — Derbyshire county
 Dorset Blue Vinney from Dorset county
 Dovedale — the valley of the River Dove, Central England
 Gloucester and Double Gloucester — the city of Gloucester
 Lancashire — Lancashire county
 Lincolnshire Poacher cheese — Lincolnshire county 
 Norbury Blue — Norbury Park, Surrey
 Parlick Fell — the hill Parlick, Lancashire
 Red Leicester — the city of Leicester
 Red Windsor — the town of Windsor, Berkshire
 Shropshire Blue — Shropshire county
 Stilton and Stichelton — the village of Stilton, Cambridgeshire
 Sussex Slipcote — the historic county of Sussex
 Swaledale — Swaledale, a valley in North Yorkshire
 Wensleydale — Wensleydale, a valley in North Yorkshire

Fruits and vegetables
 Allington Pippin (apple) — the village of Allington, Lincolnshire
 Beauty of Bath (apple) — the city of Bath, Somerset
 Beauty of Kent (apple) — County Kent
 Blenheim Orange (apple) — the parish of Blenheim, Oxfordshire
 Chelmsford Wonder (apple) — the city of Chelmsford, Essex
 Claygate Pearmain (apple) — the village of Claygate, Surrey
 Cornish Aromatic and Cornish Gilliflower (apples) — the county of Cornwall
 Flower of Kent (apple) — County Kent
 Kingston Black Apple — the village of Kingston St Mary, Somerset
 Norfolk Biffin and Norfolk Pippin (apples) — the county of Norfolk
 Oxford Marmalade — a brand named after the city of Oxford
 Ribston Pippin (apple) — the estate of Ribston Hall, North Yorkshire
 Star of Devon (apple) — Devon County
 Sturmer Pippin (apple) — the village of Sturmer, Essex
 Upton Pyne apple — the village of Upton Pyne, Devon
 Warden pear — the village of Old Warden, Bedfordshire
 Worcester Pearmain (apple) — the city of Worcester
 Wyken Pippin (apple) — the village of Wyken, now a suburb of Coventry, West Midlands
 Yorkshire Forced Rhubarb — Yorkshire county
Meat products and dishes

 Cornish game hen — the county of Cornwall
 Cumberland sausage — the historic county of Cumberland
 Devon (sausage) — Australian meat product perhaps named after the county of Devon
 Lancashire hotpot — the county of Lancashire
 Lincolnshire sausage — the county of Lincolnshire
 Melton Mowbray pork pie — the town of Melton Mowbray, Leicestershire
 Newmarket sausage — the town of Newmarket, Suffolk

 Oxford sausage — the city of Oxford
 York ham — the city of York, Yorkshire
Sauces and condiments
 Branston Pickle — the village of Branston, Staffordshire
 Crème anglaise — England
 Cumberland sauce — the historic county of Cumberland
 Tewkesbury mustard — the town of Tewkesbury, Gloucestershire
 Worcestershire sauce — the county of Worcestershire

Scotland

 Aberdeen Angus — both the city of Aberdeen and the county of Angus
 Aberdeen roll — the city of Aberdeen
 Angus beef and Angus burger — the county of Angus
 Arbroath smokie — fish from the town of Arbroath, Angus
 Selkirk bannock — raisin bread from the town of Selkirk, Scottish Borders
 Bonchester cheese — Bonchester Bridge, Roxburghshire
 Cullen skink — soup from the village of Cullen, Moray
 Dundee cake — the city of Dundee
 Dunlop cheese — the town of Dunlop, East Ayrshire
 Forfar bridie — meat pastry from the town of Forfar, Angus
 Lanark Blue — cheese from Lanarkshire county
 Marauding Scot — fruit soaked in whisky
 Scotch broth 
 Scotch egg 
 Scotch pancake 
 Scotch pie
 Scotch woodcock — eggs and anchovy on toast
 Shetland Black potato — the Shetland Islands
 Stornoway black pudding — the town of Stornoway, Outer Hebrides
 Teviotdale cheese — the valley of the River Teviot, Roxburghshire

Wales

 Bardsey apple — Bardsey Island
 Caerphilly cheese — the town of Caerphilly
 Glamorgan sausage — the historic county of Glamorgan
 Tintern cheese — the village of Tintern
 Welsh breakfast
 Welsh cake 
 Welsh onion
 Welsh rarebit
 Y Fenni cheese — the Welsh name of Abergavenny

North America
 Bermuda fish chowder — the island nation of Bermuda

Canada

 B.C. roll — the province of British Columbia
 Canadian bacon
 Canadian white bread
 Harovin Sundown pear — the town of Harrow, Ontario
 London broil — perhaps after London, Ontario
 Montreal hot dog — the city of Montreal, Quebec
 Montreal melon — Montreal
 Montreal-style bagel — Montreal
 Montreal-style smoked meat — Montreal
 Nanaimo bar — the city of Nanaimo, Vancouver Island, Canada
 Nova Scotia salmon — the province of Nova Scotia
 Oka cheese — originally manufactured by the Trappist monks in Oka, Quebec
 Pictou County Pizza — Pictou County, Nova Scotia
 Reinette du Canada — French apple named after Canada
 Saskatoonberry — Saskatoon, Saskatchewan (the city is named after the berry)
 Thousand Island dressing — the Thousand Islands archipelago in the St Lawrence river
 Yukon Gold (potato) — the territory of Yukon

Caribbean

 Bajan pepper sauce — the island nation of Barbados
 Barbados cherry — Barbados
 Haitian patty — a savory pastry from Haiti
 Jamaican red banana — Jamaica
 Jamaican jerk spice — Jamaica]
 Jamaican patty — a savory pastry from Jamaica
 Trinidad moruga scorpion pepper — the district of Moruga, Trinidad

Cuba

 Arroz a la cubana — "Cuban-style rice"
 Cuban bread
 Cuban oregano
 Cuban pastry
 Cuban sandwich
 Cubanelle pepper
 Habanero pepper — the city of Havana

Mexico

 Carne a la tampiqueña — meat dish from the city of Tampico, Tamaulipas
 Chongos zamoranos — dessert from the city of Zamora, Michoacán
 Cotija cheese — the town of Cotija de la Paz, Michoacán
 Huachinango a la Veracruzana — fish dish from the state of Veracruz
 Huevos a la mexicana — "Mexican-style eggs"
 Jalapeño pepper — the city of Xalapa, Veracruz
 Mexican mint
 Mexican turnip
 Oaxaca cheese — the state or city of Oaxaca de Juarez
 Queso Chihuahua — cheese from the state of Chihuahua
 Sonoran hot dog — the state of Sonora
 Tabasco pepper and Tabasco sauce — the state of Tabasco

United States

 Altoona-style pizza - Altoona, Pennsylvania
 American fried rice — Thai dish
 Baked Alaska — dessert named after the state of Alaska
 Calrose rice — the state of California
 Charleston red rice — the city of Charleston, South Carolina
 Denver omelette and Denver sandwich— the city of Denver, Colorado
 Hangtown fry omelette — the city of Placerville, California, between 1849 and 1854 known as "Hangtown"
 Hawaiian haystack — the state of Hawaii
 Ozark pudding — the Ozarks region of Missouri and Arkansas, USA
 Philadelphia Cream Cheese — the town of Philadelphia, Pennsylvania
California burrito - the state of California
Baked goods

 American muffin
 Boston brown bread, Boston cream doughnut and Boston cream pie — the city of Boston, Massachusetts
 California-style pizza — the state of California
 New York cheesecake — New York City
 Chicago-style pizza — the city of Chicago, Illinois
 Detroit-style pizza — the city of Detroit, Michigan
 Fig Newton — the city of Newton, Massachusetts
 Hawaiian pizza— the state of Hawaii
 Kentucky jam cake — the state of Kentucky, USA
 Key lime pie — via the Key lime from the Florida Keys islands
 Mississippi mud pie — the Mississippi River
 New England brown bread — the New England region
 New Haven-style pizza — the city of New Haven, Connecticut
 New York-style bagel, New York-style pastrami and New York-style pizza — New York City
 Parker House roll — the Parker House Hotel in Boston, Massachusetts
 Quad City-style pizza — the Quad Cities in Iowa and Illinois
 Smith Island cake — Smith Island, Maryland
 St. Louis-style pizza — the city of St. Louis, Missouri
 St. Paul sandwich — the city of Saint Paul, Minnesota
 Texas toast — the state of Texas
 Toast Hawaii — the state of Hawaii
Cheeses
 American cheese — common name for processed cheese.
 Colby cheese — Colby, Wisconsin
 Cuba cheese — Cuba, New York
 Monterey Jack — Monterey, California (not Monterrey, Mexico)
 Pinconning cheese — the city of Pinconning, Michigan
Fruits, nuts and vegetables

 Adirondack Blue and Red potatoes — the Adirondack Mountains, New York
 Anaheim pepper — the city of Anaheim, California
 Arkansas Black apple — the state of Arkansas
 Arkansas Traveler tomato — the state of Arkansas
 Boston baked beans — the city of Boston, Massachusetts
 Canadice grape— Canadice Lake, New York
 Carolina Reaper pepper — the state of South Carolina
 Concord grape — the town of Concord, Massachusetts
 Cortland apple — Cortland County, New York
 Delaware grape — the town of Delaware, Ohio
 Esopus Spitzenburg apple — the town of Esopus, New York
 Fresno chile — the city of Fresno, California
 Hanover tomato — Hanover County, Virginia
 Idared apple — the state of Idaho
 Key lime — the Florida Keys archipelago, south Florida
 Lakemont grape— the hamlet of Lakemont, New York
 Michigan salad — the state of Michigan
 New Mexico chile pepper — the state of New Mexico
 Newtown Pippin apple — the village of Newton, now a borough of New York City known as Elmhurst, Queens
 Rainier cherry — Mount Rainier, Washington
 Rhode Island Greening apple — the state of Rhode Island
 Rome Beauty apple — Rome Township, Lawrence County, Ohio
 Roxbury Russet apple — the former town of Roxbury, Boston, Massachusetts
 Santa Fe Grande pepper — the city of Santa Fe, New Mexico
 Texas caviar — pea salad from the state of Texas
 Tompkins King apple — Tompkins County, New York
 Ulster cherry — Ulster County, New York
 Vidalia onion — the city of Vidalia, Georgia
 Virginia peanut — the state of Virginia
 Wolf River apple — the Wolf River in Wisconsin
 York Imperial apple — the city of York, Pennsylvania

Meat products and dishes
 American chop suey — ground beef pasta dish basically unrelated to chop suey
 American goulash
 Barberton chicken — the city of Barberton, Ohio
 Beef Manhattan — the borough of Manhattan, New York City
 Bourbon chicken — Bourbon Street in New Orleans Louisiana
 Buffalo wing — the city of Buffalo, New York
 Chicago-style hot dog — the city of Chicago
 Chicken Maryland — the state of Maryland
 Carolina burger — the states of The Carolinas
 Coney Island hot dog — Coney Island, Brooklyn, New York City
 Filet américain or steack à l'Americaine — "American steak"
 Kansas City strip steak and Kansas City-style barbecue — Kansas City, Missouri
 Kentucky hot brown — meat sandwich from the state of Kentucky
 Lebanon bologna — the city of Lebanon, Pennsylvania
 California burger — the state of California
 Maxwell Street Polish — the Maxwell Street market in Chicago, Illinois
 Memphis-style barbecue — the city of Memphis, Tennessee
 Michigan hot dog — the state of Michigan
 Nashville hot chicken — the city of Nashville, Tennessee
 New York strip steak — New York City
 Philadelphia Pepper Pot — the city of Philadelphia, Pennsylvania
 Philly cheesesteak — the city of Philadelphia, Pennsylvania
 Pittsburgh rare steak — the city of Pittsburgh, Pennsylvania
 Rocky Mountain oysters — testicle dish named after the Rocky Mountains
 Seattle-style hot dog — the city of Seattle, Washington
 Smithfield ham — the town of Smithfield, Virginia
 Southern Louisiana Ponce — the state of Louisiana
 St. Louis-style barbecue — the city of St. Louis, Missouri
 Texas hot dog and Texas Tommy (hot dog) — the state of Texas

 Virginia ham — the state of Virginia
 Santa Maria-style barbecue — Santa Maria Valley, California
Sauces, dressings and condiments
 Buffalo sauce — the city of Buffalo, New York
 Carolina style condiments — the state of North Carolina
 Catalina dressing — Santa Catalina Island, California 
 Cincinnati chili — meat sauce from the city of Cincinnati, Ohio, USA
Thousand Island dressing — the Thousand Islands archipelago in the St Lawrence river

Seafood
 California roll — sushi roll named after the state of California
 Delaware clam chowder — the state of Delaware
 Dungeness crab — the town of Dungeness, Washington
 Hatteras clam chowder — the beach or island of Hatteras, North Carolina
 Long Island clam chowder — Long Island, New York State
 Manhattan clam chowder — the borough of Manhattan, New York City
 Maryland Blue Crab — the state of Maryland
 Maryland crab soup — the state of Maryland, USA
 New England clam chowder — the New England region
 New Jersey clam chowder — the state of New Jersey
 Philadelphia roll — sushi roll named via the cream cheese after the town of Philadelphia, New York
 Rhode Island clam chowder — the state of Rhode Island
 Seattle roll — sushi roll named after the city of Seattle, Washington

Oceania
 Anzac - A biscuit

 Australian lime — Australia 
 Australian meat pie — Australia
 Devon —  Australian sausage, perhaps named after Devon, Tasmania
 Melanesian papeda — citrus fruit from Melanesia
 New Zealand meat pie — New Zealand
 New Zealand rock oyster 
 New Zealand spinach
 Otaheite cashew — the island of Tahiti, French Polynesia
 Otaheite gooseberry — Tahiti
 Sydney rock oyster — the city of Sydney, New South Wales
 Tahiti lime — the island of Tahiti, French Polynesia
 Tahitian vanilla — Tahiti

South America

 Brazil nut — Brazil (Brazil is in turn named for the brazilwood tree, not the source of the nut)
 Butifarra Soledeñas — sausage from the city of Soledad, Atlántico, Venezuela
 Cayenne pepper — the city of Cayenne, French Guiana 
 Chanco cheese — the commune of Chanco, Chile
 Chilean salad — Chile
 Chupe Andino — stew from the Andes mountains
 Demerara sugar — from the historical region of Demerara, now part of Guyana
 Guayanés cheese — the Guayana Region of Venezuela 
 Guyanese pepperpot — the Guianas or Guyana 
 Minas cheese — the state of Minas Gerais, Brazil
 Sopa paraguaya — corn bread from Paraguay
 Suriname cherry — Suriname
 Trinidad moruga scorpion pepper — the Moruga district of Trinidad and Tobago

Peru
 Lima bean — the city of Lima
 Papa a la Huancaína — potato dish from the city, province or district of Huancayo
 Peruvian chicken
 Peruvian corn
 Peruvian pollada

By type of food

Cheeses

 Abondance — the commune of Abondance, Haute-Savoie, France
 Akkawi — the city of Acre, Israel
 Alpujarra — Alpujarra region, Andalusia, Spain
 American cheese — common name for processed cheese.
 Appenzeller — the canton of Appenzell, Switzerland
 Ashdown Foresters — the Ashdown Forest heathland, East Sussex, southeast England
 Asiago — Asiago, a plateau and town in the Venetian Prealps, Italy
 Bandel — the city of Bandel, West Bengal, India
 Banon — the town of Banon, Alpes-de-Haute-Provence, France
 Bastardo del Grappa —Monte Grappa in the Venetian Prealps, Italy
 Beacon Fell Traditional Lancashire Cheese — Beacon Fell, Lancashire, England
 Beaufort — the commune of Beaufort, Savoie
 Beemster — the Beemster polder
 Beenleigh Blue — Beenleigh Manor, Harberton, Devon England
 Bergenost — the city of Bergen, Norway
 Berner Alpkäse — the Bernese Oberland region, Switzerland
 Bleu d'Auvergne — the historical province of Auvergne, France

 Bleu de Gex — the eastern historical Pays de Gex, France
 Bonchester — Bonchester Bridge, south Scotland
 Bowland cheese — the Forest of Bowland, Lancashire, England
 Bra — the town of Bra, Piedmont, Italy
 Brie — the historical Brie region near Paris, France
 Brighton Blue — the city of Brighton, East Sussex, south England
 Buxton Blue from the town of Buxton, Derbyshire, England
 Cabrales — Cabrales, a municipality in Asturias, Spain

 Caerphilly — Caerphilly, a town in Wales
 Camembert — the town of Camembert, Normandy, France
 Cantabrian Cream — the autonomous community of Cantabria, Spain
 Cantal — the department of Cantal, France
 Casciotta d'Urbino — the city of Urbino, Marche, Italy
 Casín — Caso, a municipality in Asturias, Spain
 Castelmagno — the municipality of Castelmagno, Piedmont, Italy
 Castelo Branco — the city of Castelo Branco, Portugal

 Chanco — the commune of Chanco, Chile
 Chaource — the village of Chaource, Champagne, France
 Cheddar — the village of Cheddar, Somerset, England
 Cherni Vit — the village of Cherni Vit, Bulgaria
 Cheshire — Cheshire county, England
 Circassian — the historical region of Circassia now in Southern Russia

 Colby — the town of Colby, Wisconsin
 Coleraine — the town of Coleraine, Northern Ireland
 Comté — the eastern Franche-Comté region, France
 Coquetdale cheese — the valley of the River Coquet, Northumberland, England
 Cornish Blue, Cornish Brie and Cornish Yarg — cheeses from Cornwall, England
 Cotija — the town of Cotija de la Paz, Mexico
 Cotswold cheese — the Cotswolds area, England
 Crottin de Chavignol — the village of Chavignol, France
 Cuba cheese — the town of Cuba, New York
 Danbo cheese — Denmark

 Derby, Little Derby and Sage Derby — Derbyshire county, central England
 Dorset Blue Vinney — Dorset county, south England
 Dovedale — the valley of the River Dove, Central England
 Dubliner— the city of Dublin, Ireland
 Dunlop — the town of Dunlop, East Ayrshire, southwest Scotland

 Edam — the city of Edam, Netherlands
 Emmental — the valley of the river Emme, canton of Bern, Switzerland
 Époisses — the village of Époisses, France
 Flor de Guía — Santa María de Guía, Canary Islands
 Fourme de Montbrison — the town of Montbrison, Loire, France
 Friesian Clove — the province of Friesland, Netherlands
 Fynbo — the island of Fyn, Denmark

 Gamonéu — small town in Onís, Asturias, Spain
 Garrotxa — Garrotxa county, Catalonia, Spain
 Gloucester and Double Gloucester — the city of Gloucester, England
 Gorgonzola — the town of Gorgonzola, Milan, Italy
 Gotland Blue — the island province of Gotland, Sweden
 Gouda — the city of Gouda, Netherlands
 Grana Padano — the Po Valley (Pianura Padana), Italy
 Graviera — the region of Agrafa on Crete, Greece
 Gruyère — the town of Gruyères, Fribourg, Switzerland
 Guayanés — the Guayana Region of Venezuela 
 Gudbrandsdalsost — the Gudbrand Valley in Norway

 Harzer — the Harz mountain range in Northern Germany
 Ibores — the Ibor Valley in Extremadura, Spain
 Idiazabal — Idiazabal, small town in Basque Country, Spain
 Jarlsberg — the former county of Jarlsberg in Norway
 Kalimpong — the hill station of Kalimpong, West Bengal, India
 Korycinski — the town of Korycin, Poland
 L'Etivaz — the hamlet of L'Etivaz, Vaud, Switzerland
 La Serena — La Serena district in Extremadura, Spain
 Laguiole — the village of Laguiole, Aveyron, France
 Lanark Blue — Lanarkshire county, Scotland
 Lancashire — Lancashire county, northwest England
 Langres — the Langres plateau, Champagne region
 Lappi — Lapland region of Finland
 Leerdammer — the city of Leerdam, Netherlands
 Leyden — the city of Leiden, Netherlands
 Lighvan — the village of Liqvan in Iran
 Limburger — Limburg, a former duchy, now mostly in Belgium
 Lincolnshire Poacher cheese — Lincolnshire county, England 
 Liptauer — the historical region of Liptov in Slovakia

 Livarot — the town of Livarot in Normandy
 Mâconnais — the city of Mâcon, France
 Mahón — the city of Port Mahon, Menorca, Spain
 Mallorca — the island of Mallorca, Spain
 Manchego — La Mancha region, Spain
 Maribo — the town of Maribo in Denmark
 Maroilles — the village of Maroilles, Nord, France
 Metsovone — the region of Metsovo in Epirus, Greece

 Minas cheese — the state of Minas Gerais, Brazil
 Molbo cheese — the Mols peninsula in Jutland, Denmark
 Montasio — the mountain Jôf di Montasio in the Julian Alps, Italy
 Monte Veronese — the Province of Verona, Italy
 Monterey Jack — Monterey, California
 Morbier — the village of Morbier, Jura, France
 Morlacco — the Morlachia region, now part of Croatia
 Munster — the town Munster, Alsace, France
 Murcian and Murcian wine cheese — the Region of Murcia, Spain
 Nablusi — the city of Nablus, West Bank
 Neufchâtel — the town of Neufchâtel-en-Bray, Normandy, France
 Norbury Blue — Norbury Park, Surrey, England
 Norvegia — Norway

 Oaxaca — Oaxaca de Juarez, a state and city in Mexico
 Oka cheese — the village of Oka, Quebec, Canada
 Olomoucké tvarůžky or Olmützer — the city of Olomouc in Moravia, Czech Republic
 Ossau-iraty — the Ossau Valley and the Irati Forest in French Basque Country
 Pag cheese — the island of Pag, Croatia
 Pallone di Gravina — the town of Gravina in Puglia, Italy
 Palmero — the island of La Palma, Canary Islands
 Parlick Fell — Parlick, a hill in Lancashire county, England

 Parmesan — the city or province of Parma, Italy
 Parmigiano-Reggiano — the cities of Parma and Reggio Emilia, Italy
 Passendale cheese — the village of Passendale, Belgium
 Pecorino di Filiano — the town of Filiano, Basilicata, Italy
 Pecorino Romano — the city of Rome, Italy
 Pecorino Sardo — the island of Sardinia, Italy
 Pecorino Siciliano — the island of Sicily, Italy
 Pecorino Toscano — the region of Tuscany, Italy
 Penteleu— the Penteleu mountains, Romania
 Piave — the Piave river, Veneto, Italy
 Picón Bejes-Tresviso — the small town of Tresviso, Cantabria, Spain
 Pinconning cheese — the city of Pinconning, Michigan

 Pont-l'Évêque — the town of Pont-l'Évêque, Calvados France
 Pouligny-Saint-Pierre — the commune of Pouligny-Saint-Pierre, Indre, France
 Queijo de Nisa — the municipality of Nisa, Portugal
 Queijo do Pico — Pico Island in the Azores
 Queso Chihuahua — the state of Chihuahua in Mexico
 Ragusano — the Province of Ragusa, Sicily, Italy

 Red Leicester — the city of Leicester in central England
 Red Windsor — the town of Windsor, Berkshire, England
 Rigotte de Condrieu — the town of Condrieu, Rhône, France
 Robiola, possibly named after the town of Robbio, Lombardy, Italy
 Rocamadour — the village of Rocamadour, Lot, France
 Romano cheese — the city of Rome
 Roncal — the Roncal Valley in Navarre, Spain
 Roquefort — the village of Roquefort-sur-Soulzon, Aveyron, France
 Rosa Camuna — the Val Camonica, Lombardy, Italy
 Sainte-Maure de Touraine — the town of Sainte-Maure-de-Touraine, Indre-et-Loire, France

 Samsø — the island of Samsø, Denmark
 Santarém — the Santarém District, Portugal
 São Jorge — São Jorge Island in the Azores
 Selles-sur-Cher — the town of Selles-sur-Cher, Loir-et-Cher, France
 Serra da Estrela — the Serra da Estrela mountain range, Portugal
 Shropshire Blue — Shropshire county, west England
 Stilton and Stichelton — the village of Stilton, Cambridgeshire, England
 Sussex Slipcote — the historic county of Sussex, south England
 Svecia — Sweden

 Swaledale — Swaledale, a valley in North Yorkshire, England
 Swiss cheese — generic name in North America for several related varieties of cheese which resemble the Swiss Emmental
 Taleggio — Val Taleggio, Lombardy, Italy
 Teviotdale — the valley of the River Teviot, Roxburghshire, south Scotland
 Tilsit — the town of Tilsit in East Prussia (now Sovetsk, Russia)
 Tintern — the village of Tintern, southeast Wales
 Tomme de Savoie — the historic region of Savoy, France
 Tomme Vaudoise — the canton of Vaud, Switzerland

 Torta del Casar — Casar de Cáceres, a municipality in Extremadura, Spain
 Tzfatit — the city of Safed, Israel
 Vacherin Fribourgeois — the canton of Fribourg, Switzerland
 Valdeón — Posada de Valdeón, a municipality in Castile and León, Spain
 Valençay — the town of Valençay, Indre France
 Valle d'Aosta Fromadzo — the Aosta Valley region
 Valtellina Casera — the Valtellina valley in Lombardy, Italy

 Västerbotten cheese — the Västerbotten (West Botnia) province, Sweden
 Waterloo — the town of Waterloo, Belgium 
 Wensleydale — Wensleydale in North Yorkshire, England
 Y Fenni — the Welsh name of Abergavenny, southeast Wales
 Zamorano — the Province of Zamora, Spain

See also
 List of drinks named after places
 List of words derived from toponyms
 List of foods named after people

Notes

Geography-related lists
Lists of foods